Keiffer Jackson Mitchell Jr. (born September 28, 1967) is an American politician from Baltimore, Maryland, who once served in the Maryland House of Delegates and the Baltimore City Council and was a candidate in the 2007 mayoral election.

Background
Mitchell was born in Baltimore, Maryland, on September 28, 1967, into a political family. He is the grandson of Clarence M. Mitchell Jr., and grandnephew of U.S. Congressman Parren Mitchell. His uncle Clarence Mitchell III was a Maryland State Senator, and his father's younger brother, Michael B. Mitchell Sr., was a Baltimore city councilman and later Maryland state senator. At the age of 3, Mitchell took part in his first political campaign, handing out flyers for the State Senate bid of his uncle, Clarence M. Mitchell III. At twelve, while attending Baltimore's Boys' Latin School of Maryland, he organized a "Kids-for-Carter" campaign to support then Georgia Governor Jimmy Carter in his bid for the presidency. As an undergraduate at Emory University, he volunteered at the Democratic National Convention in Atlanta, and demonstrated against the Ku Klux Klan in rural Georgia.

Education
Mitchell graduated from Boys' Latin in Baltimore in 1986, and attended Emory University in Atlanta, Georgia, where he graduated with a degree in Political Science. He received a J.D. degree from the District of Columbia School of Law in 1994. Keiffer is a member of Alpha Epsilon Pi.

Career
While in college Mitchell served as a White House intern under the Clinton Administration, and as a law clerk for the NAACP Legal Defense Fund and later with the Maryland Public Defender's Office and the Democratic Senatorial Campaign Committee. In 1995, Mitchell returned to Boys' Latin School, to teach United States, African-American, and Maryland history. Additionally, he was also the junior varsity basketball head coach. That same year, he was elected to the Baltimore City Council, serving as Chairman of the Education and Human Resources Committee and Vice-Chairman of the Judiciary Committee.

Mitchell served as a delegate to the Democratic National Convention in Los Angeles and was appointed Chairman of Baltimore's Human Services Commission. Two years later, he was re-elected to the City Council, named to the Democratic State Central Committee and appointed 2nd Vice-Chair of the Maryland Democratic Party.

In 2002 Mitchell left Boys' Latin to further his own education with brokerage firm A. G. Edwards and later the Harbor Bank of Maryland.

Re-elected in 2004 to his third and current city council term, Mitchell serves as a member of the Judiciary and Legislative Committee and the Education, Housing, Health and Human Services Committee. In 1999 and in 2005, he was voted Baltimore's "Best Politician" by Baltimore City Paper.

Among his community activities are membership on the Echo Hill Outdoor School Board, the Family Tree Board, the Habitat for Humanity Board, and the Board of Trustees of the Boys' Latin School. A lifelong parishioner at Sharp Street United Methodist Church, he lives in Baltimore's historic Bolton Hill, where he serves on the board of his neighborhood association.

Mayoral campaign

On January 19, 2007, Mitchell returned to the corner of Pennsylvania Avenue and Laurens Street, one of the initial sites of his "Take Back the Streets" campaign, to announce his candidacy for mayor. His campaign has focused on criticism of interim Mayor Sheila Dixon's leadership especially in dealing with escalating crime. In a poll of likely Democratic voters released by The Baltimore Sun on July 16, 2007, Mitchell trailed Dixon by 32% with less than 2 months remaining in the election. It seems that crime is the main issue in Baltimore City, and Mitchell has been identified by many as being the only candidate able to quell the rising murder rate. Accordingly, he was endorsed by the Firefighters Union, the Police Union (FOP), the Sheriffs Union, and Attorney General Doug Gansler.

On August 2, 2007, Keiffer Mitchell's father, who was the treasurer for his campaign, resigned after revelations that he was spending campaign money for personal use. Some of the money was spent to stay his wife at a hotel after knee surgery, while other money withdrawn by checks payable to cash. Maryland law prohibits spending campaign money for personal uses. The younger Mitchell was forthright with the press about the issue, and expressed his disappointment. He has since hired William D. Mulholland as the campaign's treasures. Several days before the election the Mitchell family troubles again made headlines when Keiffer Mitchell's father publicly threatened to evict the campaign headquarters from an office building he owned.

On September 11, 2007, at 10:45 pm, Mitchell conceded defeat to Sheila Dixon in the Democratic primary for Mayor of Baltimore City.

Primary election results
2007 Democratic Primary for Mayor of Baltimore.

In the legislature
Mitchell served on the House Judiciary Committee from 2011 to 2013, he moved to the House Economic Matters Committee in 2014.  In 2013 he co-sponsored HB 860 (Baltimore City Public Schools Construction and Revitalization Act of 2013). Signed by the Governor on May 16, 2013, the new law approved 1.1 billion dollars to construct new schools in Baltimore City.

Democratic party activist
In December 2007, Mitchell was chosen by the Obama for President campaign to appear on the ballot as a male delegate for Obama from Maryland's 7th congressional district. In 2009, it was reported that Mitchell was considering a bid for the Maryland House of Delegates.

Democratic primary election results, 2010
2010 Race for Maryland House of Delegates – 44th District
Voters to choose three: (only the top 6 finishers are shown)
{| class="wikitable"
|-
!Name
!Votes
!Percent
!Outcome
|-
|-
|Keith E. Haynes 
|4859
|  25.9%
|   Won
|-
|-
| Keiffer J. Mitchell Jr.
|4481
|  23.9%
|   Won
|-
|-
|Melvin L. Stukes
|3321
|  17.7%
|   Won
|-
|-
| Ruth M. Kirk
|2860
|  15.2%
|   Lost
|-
|-
| Chris Blake
|973
|  5.1%
|   Lost
|-
|-
|Gary T. English  
|907 
|  4.8%
|   Lost
|-

|}

References

External links
 https://web.archive.org/web/20070709040015/http://www.keiffermitchell.com/

1967 births
Living people
Emory University alumni
David A. Clarke School of Law alumni
Baltimore City Council members
Democratic Party members of the Maryland House of Delegates
African-American state legislators in Maryland
21st-century American politicians
Mitchell family of Maryland